Franco Damián Vázquez (born 22 February 1989) is an Argentine professional footballer who plays as an attacking midfielder for Serie B club Parma and the Argentina national team.

Beginning his career with Argentine club Belgrano in 2007, Vázquez moved to Italian side Palermo in 2011. After a brief loan spell in Spain with Rayo Vallecano during the 2012–13 season, he made his breakthrough with the Sicilian club, earning a transfer to La Liga side Sevilla in 2016.

Vázquez holds both Argentine and Italian nationality as his mother was born in Italy. Internationally, he played for Italy in two friendly matches in 2015, but later declared his intention to represent his birth nation; he debuted for Argentina in 2018.

Early life 
Vázquez was born in Argentina to an Italian mother (born in Padua) and an Argentine father, therefore Vázquez holds both passports.

As a youngster he was nicknamed "El mudo", which means "Mute" in Spanish, due to his introverted nature. In his native Argentina, he is often referred to by the aforementioned nickname.

Club career

Belgrano
Nicknamed "El Mudo" ("The Mute") due to his introversion in his youth, Vázquez began his career at Argentine club Belgrano, with whom he debuted in 2007 and then became a mainstay at the club, achieving interest from a number of Italian clubs (the first being Parma in 2010) as a consequence.

Palermo
In August 2011, Vázquez was heavily linked with a move to Italian side Palermo as a replacement for fellow Argentine Javier Pastore. The move, effective from January 2012, was confirmed on 1 September 2011 for a €4.53 million transfer fee. He officially joined the Palermo squad on 29 December 2011, then debuted on 8 January in a match against Napoli. He made a total 14 appearances (mostly as a substitute) and scored no goals.

Loan to Rayo Vallecano
On 24 August 2012, Vázquez moved on loan to La Liga club Rayo Vallecano. He mostly played as a substitute and failed to make a breakthrough in the first team squad, not being signed permanently by the club at the end of the season and therefore returning to Palermo.

Return to Palermo
Vázquez was originally kept out of the squad list by head coach Gennaro Gattuso and therefore ineligible to play in any matches for the first half of the 2013–14 Serie B season. However, he was reincluded into the first team roster by new boss Giuseppe Iachini later in January 2014 as a replacement to on-loan youngster Valerio Verre. Vázquez was then being used also as a second striker in a more regular basis, a role that gave him the opportunity to score goals. In the following 2014–15 Serie A campaign, Vázquez gained notoriety thanks to him forming a successful and effective striking partnership with Paulo Dybala, which saw them both finish the season as two of the top assist providers in the league, with ten assists. On 16 January 2015, he agreed a contract extension with Palermo lasting until 30 June 2019. On 15 May 2016, he scored in a 3–2 home win over Hellas Verona to help save Palermo from relegation at the conclusion of the 2015–16 Serie A season.

Sevilla
On 16 July 2016, Vázquez returned to Spain's top flight, joining Sevilla for a reported €15 million transfer fee. On 9 August, in his first official appearance for his new club, he scored in a 3–2 extra-time defeat to Real Madrid in the 2016 UEFA Super Cup. On 20 August, he scored and assisted on his La Liga debut in a 6–4 home victory over Espanyol.

Parma
On 26 June 2021, he signed a two-year contract with Serie B club Parma, with an option to renew.

International career

Italy
A dual Argentine-Italian citizen, Vázquez had declared he was uncertain about whether to accept the possible upcoming call-up from Italy in 2014. Later in January 2015, he stated he would likely accept a call-up from then-Italy head coach Antonio Conte, in part because of the heavy competition for a spot in the Argentina national team. However, he later accepted the call, and then regretted it, declaring instead his intentions to represent Argentina. Vázquez has appeared in two international matches for Italy, both friendlies and therefore remains eligible to play for La Albiceleste.

On 21 March 2015, Vázquez received his first Italian national team call-up for a UEFA Euro 2016 qualifying match against Bulgaria and a friendly match against England. Italy head coach Antonio Conte was criticised for calling up Argentine-born Vázquez as well as Brazilian-born Éder. Speaking at a Serie A meeting on 23 March 2015, Roberto Mancini said, "The Italian national team should be Italian. An Italian player deserves to play for the national team while someone who wasn't born in Italy, even if they have relatives, I don't think they deserve to." Conte's response to the use of foreign-born players was, "If Mauro Camoranesi [who was born in Argentina] was allowed to help Italy win the 2006 World Cup, then why can't Éder and Franco Vázquez lead the Azzurri to glory in next year's European Championship?"

Vázquez made his international debut in Italy's 1–1 friendly draw against England at Juventus Stadium in Turin on 31 March 2015, coming on as a substitute for fellow oriundo Éder. He made his second appearance for Italy later that year, as a substitute in a 1–0 friendly defeat to Portugal, on 16 June.

Argentina
In August 2016, Vázquez declared his wish to represent his country of birth, Argentina, at international level, instead of Italy. In August 2018, Vázquez was called up by Argentina for their September friendlies. On 7 September 2018, Vázquez made his debut with Argentina in a 3–0 win over Guatemala, as he came on as a 56th minute substitute.

Style of play
Vázquez is a quick, talented, and mobile left-footed player, who, despite not being particularly fast, possesses a decent burst of acceleration and good physical strength, as well as excellent dribbling skills, close control, and a solid first touch, which enables him to turn past challenges, beat opposing players, and run towards goal during counter-attacks, or retain the ball in tight spaces and hold up the ball for teammates with his back to goal; he also has a penchant for using the nutmeg, which is often a trademark move he utilises in order to get past his opponents. On top of his technical skills, flair, creativity, and elegant movements on the ball, he is also known for his vision and passing ability, which make him an effective assist provider. Indeed, during the 2014–15 Serie A season, he was one of the joint top assist providers in the league, alongside his teammate Dybala, with ten assists. In addition to his creative abilities, he is also capable of contributing to his team's offence with goals, due to his accurate striking ability from distance. A hard-working and tactically versatile player, he is usually deployed as an attacking midfielder, although he has also been deployed in several other positions: he has been used as a winger, as a deep-lying playmaker in midfield, as a false 9, as a second forward, and even as an offensive-minded central midfielder, known as the mezz'ala role, in Italian. His playing style has drawn comparisons with Javier Pastore, Juan Román Riquelme, Alessandro Del Piero, and Roberto Baggio.

Career statistics

Club

International

Honours
Palermo
Serie B: 2013–14

Sevilla
UEFA Europa League: 2019–20
Individual
Serie A Top Assist Provider: 2014–15

References

1989 births
Living people
Footballers from Córdoba, Argentina
Argentine footballers
Argentina international footballers
Italian footballers
Italy international footballers
Argentine people of Italian descent
Argentine people of Venetian descent
Italian people of Argentine descent
Argentine Primera División players
Primera Nacional players
Italian expatriate footballers
Argentine expatriate footballers
Serie A players
Serie B players
La Liga players
Club Atlético Belgrano footballers
Palermo F.C. players
Rayo Vallecano players
Sevilla FC players
Parma Calcio 1913 players
Expatriate footballers in Spain
Association football midfielders
Italian expatriate sportspeople in Spain
Argentine expatriate sportspeople in Spain
Dual internationalists (football)
UEFA Europa League winning players